Osmar Loss Vieira (born 3 July 1975) is a Brazilian professional football manager.

Career
Born in Passo Fundo, Rio Grande do Sul, Loss began his career with Internacional's youth setup in 1994. On 6 July 2009, he was appointed manager of the B-side.

On 23 December 2009, Loss was appointed manager of Juventude, being sacked the following 16 August. After another spell back at Inter and Fluminense's youth setups, he was named at the helm of the former's reserves for the second time.

On 18 July 2011, Loss was appointed interim manager of the main squad, replacing sacked Paulo Roberto Falcão; his reign lasted until 12 August 2011, and he returned to the B-team. On 20 November of the following year, he was again interim, in the place of dismissed Fernandão. He returned to his previous duties on 12 December, after the appointment of Dunga.

On 17 September 2013, after being demoted to the under-20 squad by Dunga, Loss joined Corinthians and was named manager of the under-20 side. On 17 April 2015, he was appointed at the helm of Bragantino, after a partnership with Corinthians was established; his reign lasted nearly three months, and he subsequently returned to Corinthians and its under-20 squad.

On 30 January 2017, after winning the year's Copa São Paulo de Futebol Júnior, Loss was appointed Fábio Carille's assistant at the main squad. On 22 May 2018, he replaced Carille as a first team manager.

On 5 September 2018, after a 2–1 defeat to Ceará, Loss was demoted back to his previous role as an assistant. On 28 November, he was named manager of Série B side Guarani for the upcoming season.

Managerial statistics

Honours
Internacional
 Recopa Sudamericana: 2011
 Campeonato Brasileiro Sub-20: 2013

Corinthians
 Copa São Paulo de Futebol Júnior: 2015, 2017

References

External links
 
 Profile at Soccerpunter.com
 
 

1975 births
Living people
People from Passo Fundo
Brazilian football managers
Campeonato Brasileiro Série A managers
Campeonato Brasileiro Série B managers
Sport Club Internacional managers
Esporte Clube Juventude managers
Clube Atlético Bragantino managers
Sport Club Corinthians Paulista managers
Guarani FC managers
Esporte Clube Vitória managers
Sportspeople from Rio Grande do Sul